Solniki may refer to the following places:
Solniki, Lubusz Voivodeship (west Poland)
Solniki, Białystok County in Podlaskie Voivodeship (north-east Poland)
Solniki, Bielsk County in Podlaskie Voivodeship (north-east Poland)